John Bower (November 8, 1940 – June 6, 2017) was an American nordic combined skier who competed in the 1960s and later went on to become a coach of the American nordic skiing team for the 1976 and 1980 Winter Olympic team. He also became the first non-European to ever win at the Holmenkollen Ski Festival in Norway with his 1968 victory in the Nordic combined event, winning the prestigious King's Cup.

A native of Auburn, Maine, Bower attended Middlebury College in Vermont, where he won the NCAA national championship in Nordic combined in 1961. After graduating from Middlebury in 1963, he joined the United States Army and serve during the mid-1960s. Bower also won the national Nordic combined event four times (1963, 1966–8). Competing in two Winter Olympics, Bower finished 15th in the Nordic combined event at Innsbruck in 1964 and 13th in the same event at Grenoble in 1968.  After his retirement from Nordic combined competition, Bower went on to coach the Nordic skiing team for both the 1976 and 1980 Winter Olympics and later served as program director for the U.S. Nordic Combined Ski Team.

After retirement, Bower and his wife Bonnie moved to Park City, Utah, where Bonnie started the Park City Winter School to allow skiers to attend school in the summer while competing in the winter. John became the first director of the Utah Olympic Park when it first opened in 1989. Utah Olympic Park would later host several competitions during the 2002 Winter Olympics. Bower's son Ricky (born 1980) won the Snowboarding half-pipe World Championships in Germany in 1999.

In 1999, Sports Illustrated magazine ranked him 19th among Maine's 50 Greatest Athletes of the 20th century. He was the first of five Americans to win a Nordic combined event at the Holmenkollen Ski Festival, considered the premier event in nordic combined. Other American King's Cup winners include Kerry Lynch (1983), Todd Lodwick (1998), Bill Demong (2009) and Bryan Fletcher (2012).

References

"Christian Science Monitor" article on John Bower winning King's Cup
Christian Science Monitor article on Bowers' son Ricky
 
Middlebury College's skiing program listing Bower

Olympic nordic combined individual results: 1948-64
Olympic nordic combined individual results: 1968-84
Sports Illustrated 50 Greatest Maine Sports Figures - December 27, 1999

John Bower's obituary

1940 births
2017 deaths
American male cross-country skiers
American male Nordic combined skiers
Holmenkollen Ski Festival winners
Middlebury College alumni
Cross-country skiers at the 1964 Winter Olympics
Cross-country skiers at the 1968 Winter Olympics
Nordic combined skiers at the 1964 Winter Olympics
Nordic combined skiers at the 1968 Winter Olympics
Olympic cross-country skiers of the United States
Olympic Nordic combined skiers of the United States
Sportspeople from Auburn, Maine
People from Park City, Utah
United States Army soldiers
Sportspeople from Vermont